Podocarpus capuronii is a species of conifer in the family Podocarpaceae. It is endemic to Madagascar.

Habitat and range
Podocarpus capuronii is native to the highlands of Madagascar, where it ranges from 1,320 to 2,800 meters elevation. Herbarium specimens have been collected as high as 2000 meters, but it has been observed in subalpine ericoid thickets as high as 2800 meters.

It is found on infertile sandy soils over quartzite or gneiss, on rocky slopes and ridges, and along streams in ravines. This plant slow-growing and stunted in form when growing on open, sandy sites, but in forested areas it can grow to 20 meters tall.

Taxonomy
The Latin specific epithet of capuronii is in honor of the French botanist René Capuron.

References

capuronii
Endemic flora of Madagascar
Flora of the Madagascar subhumid forests
Endangered flora of Africa
Taxonomy articles created by Polbot
Taxa named by David John de Laubenfels